Laplae or Lablae is a district (amphoe) in the western part of Uttaradit province, northern Thailand.

History
In the past, the district office of Laplae was in Mueang Thung Yang. Later it was moved to Mon Cham Sin, about 1 km north of the present location. As the location of the office was inconvenient to reach, Luang Si Phanon Mat ordered to move the district office to Mon Sayammin. At the same time, King Chulalongkorn visited Laplae and chose Mon Cham Sin as the location of the Buddha statue named Phra Luea. This statue was made from the gold left after completion of the Buddha statue called Phra Phuttha Chinnarat in neighboring Phitsanulok.

Legend of Laplae
Laplae means 'hidden from sight'. One guess as to the origin of the name is that the path to get there is so obscure that the uninitiated get lost. Another idea is that in ancient times the people of the cities of Nan and Phrae would seek refuge in the densely forested valleys of Laplae in times of war. The local people believe that only a good man can reach Laplae.

There is a story that has been passed down known as "the legend of Laplae". It tells that once upon a time, there was a man who saw two beautiful women walking out from Laplae carrying leaves. The women proceeded to hide these leaves. The man was curious so he took one of the leaves. In the afternoon, one of the women came back and couldn't find her leaf. The man then appeared before her and offered her a trade: she had to take the man to Laplae with her if he gave her the leaf. She accepted and led the man to Laplae. 
Then the man noticed that in Laplae there were only women. The woman explained that in Laplae there is a rule that no one is allowed to lie and that the men couldn't keep their word and only the women could.

Time passed by and the man and woman fell in love with each other and they married and had a child. One day, the woman went outside and the baby cried so the man lied to it and said that his mother was coming back. The mother came back and heard the man lie so he needed to leave Laplae. Before the man left Laplae, the woman prepared filled a bag with food and turmeric roots for him to take back to his own village. The man took the bag but during his journey it became very heavy so he threw out some of the turmeric roots. When he arrived home he found that the one remaining turmeric had turned into gold. He was very surprised so he ran back to where he had thrown away the rest but these had changed back into ordinary turmeric roots. He tried to return to Laplae but he couldn't find it so he went back to his own village.

Geography
Neighboring districts are (from the east clockwise) Mueang Uttaradit, Tron of Uttaradit Province, Si Satchanalai of Sukhothai province and Den Chai of Phrae province

Economy
Approximately 27,000 rai, 43 km2, of Laplae district is cultivated in durians, making it the biggest durian producer in northern Thailand.

Handwoven cotton from Laplae, using natural dyes, are a five-star OTOP product.

Administration
The district is divided into eight sub-districts (tambon), which are further subdivided into 63 villages (muban). There are three townships (thesaban tambon): Si Phanom Mat covers tambon Si Phanom Mat, Hua Dong parts of tambon Mae Phun, and Thung Yang parts of the tambon Thung Yang and Phai Lom. There are a further seven tambon administrative organizations (TAO).

Festivals

 The Atthami Bucha Festival Laplae is held each year a week after Vesak at Wat Phra Borom That Thung Yang to commemorate the cremation of the Buddha.
 The Durian Festival is held each year around the beginning of June.

References

External links
http://www.uttaradit.go.th/tour/lablae/lap.html

Laplae